Iridomyrmex macrops is a species of ant in the genus Iridomyrmex. Described by Heterick and Shattuck in 2011, the species is endemic to several states in Australia.

Etymology
The name derives from the Greek language, which refers to the ant containing large eyes.

References

Iridomyrmex
Hymenoptera of Australia
Insects described in 2011